Timothy John Richmond (born October 9, 1948, in Corvallis) is an American molecular biologist, biochemist, and biophysicist.

He graduated in 1970 with a bachelor's degree in biochemistry from Purdue University, where his teachers included Larry G. Butler (died 1997) and Michael G. Rossmann. Richmond graduated in 1975 from Yale University's department of molecular biophysics and biochemistry with a dissertation on protein-DNA interaction under the supervision of Frederic M. Richards and Thomas A. Steitz. Richmond was a postdoc at Yale University from 1975 to 1978 under the supervision of Frederic M. Richards and from 1978 to 1980 at the MRC Laboratory of Molecular Biology under the supervision of Sir Aaron Klug studying the nucleosome (which is the fundamental subunit of chromatin). Richmond was from 1980 to 1987 a tenured staff scientist at the MRC Laboratory of Molecular Biology and in 1987 was appointed "Professor of X-ray Crystallography of Biological Macromolecules" at ETH Zurich's Institute for Molecular Biology and Biophysics. At ETH Zurich he became in 2005 vice-chair of the biology department.

He was the postdoctoral supervisor of Karolin Luger.

Richmond was elected in 1994 a fellow of the American Association for the Advancement of Science (AAAS). He was elected a member in 1995 of the European Molecular Biology Organization (EMBO), in 2000 of the Academia Europaea, in 2004 of the German National Academy of Sciences Leopoldina, and in 2007 of  the U.S. National Academy of Sciences. In 2001 he was awarded an honorary doctor of science degree by Purdue University. His prizes or awards include the Louis-Jeantet Prize for Medicine in 2002 and the Marcel Benoist Prize in 2006.

Selected publications
  (over 1250 citations)
 
 
  (over 10300 citations)
 
 
 
 
 
  (over 1600 citations)
  2003 (over 1450 citations)
 
 
 
  (over 900 citations)

References

American biochemists
American molecular biologists
American crystallographers
Purdue University alumni
Yale University alumni
Academic staff of ETH Zurich
Fellows of the American Association for the Advancement of Science
Members of Academia Europaea
Members of the German Academy of Sciences Leopoldina
Members of the United States National Academy of Sciences
Members of the European Molecular Biology Organization
1948 births
Living people